The 293rd Rifle Division began service as a standard Red Army rifle division shortly after the German invasion. It served in the defense of Kiev, and managed to escape encirclement, spending the winter along the front near Kursk. It fought in the unsuccessful Soviet offensive on Kharkov in May, 1942. In the early summer the division fought along the Don River against the German offensive, and after rebuilding in the Battle of Stalingrad, where it played a leading role in the encirclement and destruction of German Sixth Army, for which it was raised to Guards status as the 66th Guards Rifle Division as the battle was still ongoing. A second 293rd was raised a few months later and won distinction against the Japanese in Manchuria in August 1945.

1st Formation 
The division began forming on July 18, 1941 at Sumy, based on various reserve formations from Sumy Oblast, Chernivtsi Oblast and Kharkiv Oblast, Ukraine. Major General Pavel Lagutin would command the division throughout its 1st formation. Its main order of battle was as follows:
 1032nd Rifle Regiment
 1034th Rifle Regiment
 1036th Rifle Regiment
 817th Artillery Regiment.

The 293rd was almost immediately assigned to Southwestern Front to complete its formation. On August 18, it was assigned to 40th Army of that front, defending the northeast shoulder of the Kiev salient; as a result it escaped being encircled in the German offensive in September. In the second week of that month it was defending the towns of Krepali and Vorozhba from elements of the German 2nd Panzer Group, but was soon retreating by way of Sumy to the vicinity of Kursk, where it would spend a relatively uneventful winter, becoming involved on the periphery of the fighting near Kharkov in the spring.

Following this, the division was assigned to the 21st Army, where it remained for almost a year. In this army it offered resistance to the German summer offensive along the Don River, and managed again to escape when four of the army's divisions were cut off. The army crossed to the east bank of the Don and in July became part of Stalingrad Front. By this time the 293rd was no longer combat capable. On June 15 the division's strength returns showed a total of just 1,374 men, with six field guns and three antitank guns. Various divisional assets were transferred to 76th Rifle Division of the same army while the divisional cadre was sent into reserve at Buzuluk in the South Urals for rebuilding over the next three months.

When this was complete in late October the division had a strength of 10,420 officers and men, less than 500 short of full complement at that period. Broken down by nationality, there were 4,523 Russians, 1,225 Ukrainians and Belorussians, 2,280 Kazakhs, 269 Jews, three men from the Baltic republics and one Chechen; the remaining troops came from several other Central Asian nationalities. Two-thirds of the officers and about 20 percent of the NCOs and men were members of the Communist Party or the Komsomol. The rebuilt division soon rejoined 21st Army, once again in Southwestern Front.

In early November, the 293rd entered the Kletskaya bridgehead on the west bank of the Don in preparation for Operation Uranus. On the 14th, the 1034th Rifle Regiment staged a reconnaissance-in-force against the German and Romanian lines; at a cost of 106 dead and 277 wounded or shell-shocked, this attack uncovered the entire enemy fire plan in preparation for the main offensive which began on the 19th. The full division participated in the breakthrough of the German/Romanian front, reaching Kalach-na-Donu a day after it was liberated by the armored forces and the encirclement completed. This was followed by a five-day battle for the village of Illarionovskaya.

During the following month, 21st Army, transferred to Don Front for Operation Ring, was in the westernmost sector of the encircling lines, gradually pushing east. The 293rd liberated Pitomnik on January 16, 1943, and Gumrak on the night of January 21/22. On that same date, Stalin's order No. 34 was received:

In April, 21st Army would be reorganized as the 6th Guards Army.

2nd Formation 
The second 293rd Rifle Division was one of six new divisions formed in the Transbaikal in mid-July, 1943. Col. Stepan Mikhailovich Sgibnev was appointed to command on July 15, and he would remain in this post for the duration. The division's order of battle remained the same as the first formation. It spent most of the remainder of the war in the 2nd Rifle Corps in the Transbaikal Front reserves, but in June, 1945 it was transferred as a separate rifle division to 36th Army of the same front for the duration. When the Soviet Union declared war on Japan on August 9, 1945, the division joined in the advance into Manchuria as part of Gen. Fomenko's Operational Group. This group overwhelmed the under-manned Japanese fixed fortifications at Chalainor-Manzhouli on the first day, and the remainder of the campaign was a mostly unopposed pursuit. In recognition of this success, the division was awarded the Order of the Red Banner. It was disbanded later in spring and summer 1946 with 36th Army.

In popular culture
Mansur Abdulin's memoir Red Road from Stalingrad is based on his experiences fighting as an ordinary soldier in the 293rd (and later the 66th Guards) at Stalingrad and afterwards. It was published in Russian in 1991 and in English in 2004.

References

Citations

Bibliography
 
  p. 249

External links 
Pavel Filippovich Lagutin

293
Military units and formations established in 1941
Military units and formations disestablished in 1946
Military units and formations awarded the Order of the Red Banner